Sing a Song for You is a folk album released in 1997 by Anne Briggs. It was originally recorded in March 1973 but was initially withheld from release as Anne Briggs reportedly wasn't satisfied with her singing on the album.

The album is the only instance of Anne Briggs recording together with a band. The band was Ragged Robin, a short-lived electric folk outfit founded by folk musician and singer-songwriter Steve Ashley. In October 1996 Briggs commented: "It was a lot of fun playing with Ragged Robin — the only time in my life I've ever worked with a group — they were tolerant of my inability to know what key I was playing or singing in, or even what chords I was playing [if any]!"

Track listing 
All tracks composed by Anne Briggs; except where noted.
"Hill's of Greenmor" (Traditional; arranged by Anne Briggs) - 3:15
"Sing a Song for You" - 4:24
"Sovay" (Traditional; adapted by A. L. Lloyd) - 3:14
"I Thought I Saw You Again" - 3:39
"Summer's In" - 5:15
"Travelling Easy" - 4:37
"The Bonambuie" (Traditional; arranged by Anne Briggs) - 4:28
"Tongue and Cheek" - 3:58
"Bird in the Bush" (Traditional; adapted by A. L. Lloyd) - 3:16
"Sullivan's John" (Traditional; arranged by Anne Briggs) - 4:10

Personnel
 Anne Briggs – vocals, guitar, Irish bouzouki
 Barry Dransfield – violin (5,10)
 Ragged Robin - accompaniment (2,4-6,10)
 Steve Ashley - vocals, harmonica, whistle
 Richard Byers - vocals, guitar, mandolin
 Brian Diprose - bass guitar
 John Thompson - drums, percussion

References

1997 albums
Anne Briggs albums